The European Journal of General Practice is a quarterly peer-reviewed medical journal covering family medicine. It was established in 1995 and is published by Taylor & Francis. It is the official journal of WONCA Europe. The editor-in-chief is Jelle Stoffers (Maastricht University). According to the Journal Citation Reports, the journal has a 2014 impact factor of 1.217.

References

External links 

Family medicine journals
Quarterly journals
Publications established in 1995
Taylor & Francis academic journals
English-language journals
Academic journals associated with international learned and professional societies of Europe